Lim Si Pin is a Malaysian politician. He ever served as the head of the youth wing of Parti Gerakan Rakyat Malaysia (Gerakan), a component party of Barisan Nasional (BN) coalition; from 2008 to 2011.

Lim is the son of Lim Keng Yaik, a former cabinet minister and president of Gerakan.

He contested the Malaysian General Election 2008 for the Barisan Nasional held parliamentary seat of Batu, Kuala Lumpur, but was defeated by Tian Chua of the opposition People's Justice Party (PKR).

Election results

Honours

 Commander of the Order of the Territorial Crown (PMW) – Datuk (2012)

References

Living people
1969 births
Parti Gerakan Rakyat Malaysia politicians
21st-century Malaysian politicians